Cub Crafters, Inc. (often styled CubCrafters) is an aircraft manufacturer based in Yakima, Washington. Founded in 1980, by Jim Richmond, to build parts and supplementary type certificate (STC) modifications for the Piper PA-18 Super Cub, its CC18-180 Top Cub was Federal Aviation Administration-certified on December 16, 2004 and remained in production in February 2017. The Top Cub is a new aircraft based on the shape and attributes of the Super Cub, but incorporating modern materials and technology.

The CC18-180 Top Cub was granted a type certificate (TC) by Transport Canada on 23 July 2008 and achieved Australian certification in August that year. In July 2015 the company announced that it had sold the TC for the CC18 to the Liaoning Cub Aircraft Corporation of China. Cub Crafters licences the TC back to continue to produce the aircraft for the non-Chinese market. The Liaoning Cub Aircraft Corporation plans to produce the design for flight training, aerial photography, mapping, agriculture and personal use.

Cub Crafters also produces a light-sport aircraft, the CC11-100 Sport Cub, based on the original Piper J-3 Cub's appearance. The Carbon Cub replaces many aluminium parts with carbon fiber to lighten the empty weight and allow for additional payload.

The company also has a service and overhaul facility for PA-18 Super Cubs and other Cub derivative designs.

In June 2016 the company introduced a new type certified design, the XCub, which had been secretly developed over six years.

In July 2022 the company announced that it intended to raise investment capital by selling preferred shares for US$5, with a minimum purchase of US$400, aimed at customers and aviation enthusiasts. The offer will be under the U.S. Securities and Exchange Commission's Regulation A, which exempts normal registration requirements imposed in a traditional initial public offering (IPO). AVweb noted it as "surely a first for a small aircraft company". In November 2022, the company earned a Securities and Exchange Commission “qualification” to make the US$50 million dollar public IPO.

In December 2022, the company acquired Summit Aircraft Skis of Sandpoint, Idaho, a manufacturer of aircraft skis.

Jim Richmond
The founder of Cub Crafters, Jim Richmond, died on November 21, 2021, aged 67. He was born in Anchorage, Alaska, on December 2, 1953, and grew up in Easton, Washington.

Aircraft
 CC19-180 XCub
 CC18-180 Top Cub
 CC11-100 Sport Cub
 Carbon Cub FX
 CC11-160 Carbon Cub SS
 Carbon Cub EX
 NX Cub (nosewheel equipped)

References

Aircraft manufacturers of the United States
Companies based in Yakima, Washington
1980 establishments in Washington (state)